Céline Dion en concert (meaning Céline Dion in Concert) is the first live album by Canadian singer Celine Dion, released in Quebec, Canada on 20 December 1985. It includes mostly French-language hits, but also covers of "Up Where We Belong", "Over the Rainbow" and "What a Feeling".

Content
The album was recorded during sold-out concert at the Place des Arts in Montreal, on 31 May 1985, which was a part of the Céline Dion en concert tour. Dion performed 36 concerts in 25 Quebec cities during that tour. She sang also three English songs: Joe Cocker and Jennifer Warnes' "Up Where We Belong", Judy Garland's "Over the Rainbow" and Irene Cara's "What a Feeling".

The Canadian 1985 TV special included several different songs than were on the album, such as "Avec toi", "Amoureuse" and "C'est pour toi".

There were no singles issued to promote this album, which also included "Carmen "L'amour est enfant de bohême"" and homages to Félix Leclerc and Michel Legrand.

Harvey Robitaille won Félix Award for Sound Engineer of the Year thanks to Céline Dion en concert tour and the tour was nominated for the Félix Award for Show of the Year.

During her Falling Into You Around the World Tour in 1996-97, as shown in her Live in Memphis home video, Dion recalled in one of her speeches how she used to sing "What a Feeling" when she was a little girl. She did not know English that well at the time, and had to learn some of the lyrics phonetically.

In 2003, Dion recorded one of the songs from Céline Dion en concert, called "Quand on s'aime" as a duet with René Simard, which appeared on his album Hier...encore. Live performance of "Bozo" was included on Céline une seule fois / Live 2013 (2014).

Commercial performance
The album reached number nineteen in Quebec.

Track listing
All tracks produced by Paul Baillargeon.

Charts

Release history

References

External links

1985 live albums
Albums produced by Eddy Marnay
Celine Dion live albums
Music of Montreal